Fenton Aylmer (1862–1935) was a Victoria Cross recipient and 13th Aylmer baronet.

Fenton Aylmer may also refer to:

Sir Fenton Aylmer, 7th Baronet (1770–1816) of the Aylmer baronets
Sir Fenton Aylmer, 15th Baronet (1901–1987) of the Aylmer baronets
Captain Fenton John Aylmer (1835–1862) of the Aylmer baronets family
Fenton Aylmer (born 1965), heir apparent to the Aylmer baronets